Angola and Argentina are members of the Group of 77 and the United Nations.

History
During the Atlantic slave trade, Portugal and Spain transported many African slaves from Angola to Brazil, and from there were transported to Argentina. In November 1975, Angola gained its independence from Portugal. In September 1977, Argentina recognized the independence and established diplomatic relations with Angola. 

Soon after gaining independence, Angola entered into a civil war which lasted until 2002. In 1985, Argentine Foreign Minister, Dante Caputo, paid a visit to Angola. In May 2005, Angolan President, José Eduardo dos Santos, paid an official visit to Argentina. In May 2012, Argentine President, Cristina Fernández de Kirchner, paid an official visit to Angola.

In 2013, Angolan Foreign Minister, Georges Rebelo Chikoti, paid a visit to Argentina and met his counterpart, Héctor Timerman. During the visit, both Foreign Ministers held a meeting within the framework of the political consultation mechanisms and discussed current bilateral relations between both nations.

High-level visits
 
High-level visits from Angola to Argentina
 President José Eduardo dos Santos (2005)
 Foreign Secretary of State Rui Mangueira (2011)
 Foreign Minister Georges Rebelo Chikoti (2013)
 Deputy Foreign Minister Manuel Domingos Augusto (2015)

High-level visits from Argentina to Angola
 Foreign Minister Dante Caputo (1985, 1988)
 Foreign Minister Héctor Timerman (2012)
 President Cristina Fernández de Kirchner (2012)

Bilateral agreements
Both nations have signed a few bilateral agreement such as an Agreement on trade (1983); Agreement on Economic, Technical, Scientific and Cultural Cooperation (1998); Memorandum of Understanding on Agriculture (2004); Agreement regarding Consultations on Matters of Common Interest (2005); Agreement on Economic and Trade Cooperation (2005); Agreement of Cooperation in Agriculture and Livestock (2005); and an Agreement for the Elimination of Visas in Diplomatic and Service Passport Holders (2012).

Resident diplomatic missions
 Angola has an embassy in Buenos Aires.
 Argentina has an embassy in Luanda.

See also
 Afro-Argentines
 Angolan Argentine

References

 

 
Argentina
Angola